Integral Ad Science (IAS) is an American publicly owned technology company that analyzes the value of digital advertising placements. Integral Ad Science is known for addressing issues around fraud, viewability and brand risk, as well as TRAQ, a proprietary media quality score.

The company evaluates the quality of online ad placements between media buyers and sellers. It creates products for agencies and marketers, programmatic players and media sellers. Integral is a member of the Interactive Advertising Bureau and works with the "Brand Integrity Program Against Piracy" initiative by the Trustworthy Accountability Group.

Integral Ad Science was founded in 2009 by Will Luttrell, Helene Monat, Foster Provost, Bryan St. John, Josh Attenberg and Kent Wakeford; with initial investment from Coriolis Ventures. It was originally named "AdSafe Media". The company is headquartered in New York City and has locations in Chicago, San Francisco, Berlin, London, Paris, Singapore, Melbourne, Sydney and Pune.

History
Integral Ad Science started as AdSafe Media, an online ad verification company. It was founded by Will Luttrell, Helene Monat, Foster Provost, Bryan St. John, Josh Attenberg and Kent Wakeford in 2009, with initial investment from Coriolis Ventures. In 2010, AdSafe Media raised more than $7 million in Series B funding led by Accomplice. In 2012, the company raised an additional $10 million in funding from Pelion Venture Partners, Accomplice and Coriolis Ventures.

In 2012, AdSafe Media rebranded as Integral Ad Science, a media valuation company. In 2013, Crain's New York Business recognized Integral as one of the Best Places to Work.

In January 2014, Integral's ad verification technology was accredited by the Media Rating Council. The company also raised $30 million in a Series D funding round led by August Capital. It has raised more than $47 million in total funding. In February 2014, Integral Ad Science acquired Simplytics, a UK-based mobile advertising analytics company. In March 2014, the company announced international offices in Singapore and Germany. In September 2014, the company announced Causal Impact, a ROI measurement tool for online advertising. It was recognized on Crain's 2014 Fast 50 and Best Places to Work.

Forbes named Integral as one of America's Most Promising Companies of 2014. Integral was also ranked on the 2014 Inc. 5000 list. In January 2015, Integral's video ad viewability technology was accredited by the Media Rating Council. Integral announced its expansion to Sydney, Australia in early 2015. In February 2015, the company opened its Anti-Fraud Lab for research and development of fraud detection and prevention in Seattle, Washington. In March 2015, Integral acquired Veenome, a DC-based video advertising analytics company. In July 2016, Integral acquired Swarm Enterprises, a San Francisco-based bot detection company to bolster their advertising fraud detection product. 

In December 2018, Lisa Utzschneider was hired as the chief executive officer (CEO) of IAS. The former CEO, Scott Knoll, moved into an advisory role.

TRAQ
TRue Advertising Quality, also known as TRAQ, is an ad quality scoring system created by Integral Ad Science. The system gives scores from 250 to 1,000, which buyers and sellers use to value media by assessing metrics including brand safety, ad fraud, page content and structure, time viewed, share of view, and ad clutter.

Partnerships
Integral is partnered with multiple buyers and sellers, including agency holding groups and DSP's. Integral is partnered with Nielsen, which uses Integral's viewability measurement. In August 2014, Integral partnered with TubeMogul for anti-fraud verification and viewability measurement. In January 2015, MediaMath partnered with IAS to use Integral's pre-bid targeting tool, Bid Expert. In June 2019, IAS announced it was partnering with Verizon and multiple connected TV (CTV) publishers, including NBC Universal and CBS Interactive, for a pilot verification program to tackle CTV ad fraud.

References

Further reading
Faulty Fraud Predictions Are Harming Digital Advertising

External links
Official website

Business services companies established in 2009
Companies based in New York City
2009 establishments in New York City